Stavros Paravas (April 15, 1935 – September 15, 2008) was a Greek actor.

Biography

He was born on April 15, 1935 in the Athens neighborhood of Tourkovounia. His parents were poor refugees from Asia Minor, and he helped his family financially doing odd jobs. After a successful audition, he entered the drama school of K. Michailidis for free.

During the dictatorship, he was arrested for opposition against the regime and was exiled to Gyaros.

He married a British lady Anne and raised three children, Jonathan, Martha and Vanessa.  The first child Jonathan suddenly died later.

In February 2006, he suffered severe health problems including headaches and years of lung problems with his heart in which he felt better.

He died on September 15, 2008 from a heart attack and he was buried two days later.

As an artist

His first appearance in theater was in 1955 in To proto psema with Katerina Andreadi's company. In the early years of his career he worked with Vilma Kyrou, Dinos Iliopoulos and Kostas Hatzichristos.

In the 1970s, he turned with reviews.  His presentation Dirlanda which halted and his reason for his exile.  In the next decade, he appeared in several classical roles.  His first appearance was in Epidaurus in Plutus by Aristophanes.

Filmography

References

Sources
Pinakothiki Feliou, apo to Logotheidis kai Meta, Kostas Papassilios, Ebiria ekdotiki (Πινακοθήκη Γέλιου,από το Λογοθετίδη και μετά, Κώστας Παπασπήλιος, Εμπειρία εκδοτική, 2002), 2002 , p 158-167

External links

1935 births
2008 deaths
Greek male film actors
Male actors from Athens